This page gives a list of domesticated animals, also including a list of animals which are or may be currently undergoing the process of domestication and animals that have an extensive relationship with humans beyond simple predation. This includes species which are semi-domesticated, undomesticated but captive-bred on a commercial scale, or commonly wild-caught, at least occasionally captive-bred, and tameable. In order to be considered fully domesticated, most species have undergone significant genetic, behavioural and morphological changes from their wild ancestors, while others have changed very little from their wild ancestors despite hundreds or thousands of years of potential selective breeding. A number of factors determine how quickly any changes may occur in a species, but there is not always a desire to improve a species from its wild form. Domestication is a gradual process, so there is no precise moment in the history of a given species when it can be considered to have become fully domesticated.

Zooarchaeology has identified three classes of animal domesticates:
 Pets (dogs, cats, ferrets, hamsters, etc.)
 Livestock (cattle, sheep, pigs, goats, etc.)
 Beasts of burden (horses, camels, donkeys, etc.)

Domesticated animals

Tame and partially domesticated animals 
Due to the somewhat unclear outlines of what precisely constitutes domestication, there are some species that may or may not be fully domesticated. There are also some species that are extensively used or kept as pets by humans, but are not significantly altered from wild-type animals. Most animals on this second table are at least somewhat altered from wild-type animals due to their extensive interactions with humans, albeit not to the point that they are regarded as distinct forms (therefore, no separate wild ancestors are noted). Many of them could not be released into the wild, or are in some way dependent on humans.

Taxonomical groupings 
The categories used in the Taxon group column are: 
1a: Artiodactyla except Bovidae, 1b: Bovidae, 1c: Carnivora, 1d: Rodentia, 1e: Other mammals
2a: Anseriformes, 2b: Galliformes, 2c: Columbiformes, 2d: Passeriformes, 2e: Psittaciformes, 2f: Palaeognathae , 2g: Other birds
3a: Serpentes, 3b: Lacertilia, 3c:  Testudines, 3d: Other reptiles
4a: Anura, 4b: Other amphibians
5a: Cyprinidae, 5b: Other fish
6a: Hymenoptera, 6b: Other insects, 6c: Other arthropods
7a: Mollusca, 7b: Annelida, 7c: Other animals

See also 
List of domesticated plants
List of domesticated fungi and microorganisms

References 

 
 
Domesticated animals
Domesticated animals